Raphael Perpetuo Mercado Lotilla (born June 16, 1958), also known as Popo, is a Filipino lawyer, businessman and government official. He is the Secretary of Energy under the administrations of Presidents Gloria Macapagal Arroyo and Bongbong Marcos, respectively.

Education
Lotilla studied at University of the Philippines Diliman, where he obtained his Bachelor of Science in Psychology (1980), Bachelor of Arts in History, and Bachelor of Laws (1984). He then attended University of Michigan, where he obtained his Master of Laws in 1987.

Career
Lotilla began his career as an assistant professor of law in 1985 at University of the Philippines Diliman. He was also an adjunct faculty at the Asian Institute of Management.

Lotilla also served as legal consultant at the Office of Senate President, Senate Committee on Foreign Relations, and some senators beginning in 1987. He was also named as the legal adviser of the National Economic and Development Authority in 1990.

Lotilla served as PSALM Chief Operating Officer. He served as President and Chief Executive Officer of the Power Sector Assets and Liabilities Management Corporation (PSALM). 

He was Deputy Director-General (DDG) from 1996 to January 2004. He was the supervising official of the secretariat of the Legislative-Executive Development Advisory Council (LEDAC). As adviser of LEDAC, his key reform bill was the Electric Power Industry Reform Act of 2001 that privatized the power sector's entire supply chain.

Lotilla's first term as the Secretary of Energy was under President Gloria Macapagal Arroyo from 2005 to 2007. His second term began on July 11, 2022 under President Bongbong Marcos.

References

|-

Living people

1958 births
Arroyo administration cabinet members
Bongbong Marcos administration cabinet members
Filipino academics
20th-century Filipino businesspeople
Academic staff of De La Salle University
Academic staff of the University of the Philippines
Academic staff of the Asian Institute of Management
Secretaries of Energy of the Philippines
People from Antique (province)
21st-century Filipino businesspeople